"Che ti dice la Patria?" is a short story by American author Ernest Hemingway set in Italy. The Italian title may be translated as "What does the homeland tell you?"

Publication
This story was first published in The New Republic (May 18, 1927), under the title "Italy – 1927 ". Under the new title the story was included, later that year, in the collection Men Without Women.

Plot summary
The story is about a journey through Spezia and Genoa, two years after Benito Mussolini became dictator of Italy.  The story records a journey marked by "ten days of disappointing weather, unpleasant interactions with the locals, and bad food".

See also
The Complete Short Stories of Ernest Hemingway
Ernest Hemingway bibliography

References

External links
 Full text of "Che Ti Dice La Patria?" at HathiTrust Digital Library

1927 short stories
Short stories by Ernest Hemingway
Liguria in fiction
La Spezia